Mushtaq Kak (Dogri/Kashmiri: मुश्ताक़ काक (Devanagari), مُشتاق کاک (Nastaleeq); b. 1961 in Jammu & Kashmir, India) is an Indian actor and director. Kak's parents are from Jammu & Kashmir,his father is a Kashmiri, of the Kak caste, while his mother is a Dogra.

Early life 
Earlier, he was associated with Shri Ram Centre, New Delhi as the artistic director. He has also received the best director award for Andha Yug, Malika, and Pratibimb. Of his plays, Maha Brahmin and Alladad were adjudged best plays for the years 1999 and 2000, respectively. His production "Andorra" with Kartik Chaudhry as Pyder was a big hit. He Directed more than 100 plays all from different writers. Few of them are short stories by Saadat Hasan Mantos, Anton Chekhov's Cheery ka bagicha, Vijay Tendulkar's ghansi ram kotwal, Krishan Chander's Gadhe Ke Wapsi, Sharad Joshi's alladad, Vasant Kanetkar's Kasturi Mrig, Moti Lal Kemmo's Nagar Udaas, Federico Garcia's The Blood Wedding.
He has also acted in Hindi Movies like Hijack, Sikandar, Hollywood movie Amal, Shikara Vishwaroopam, Vishwaroopam II, Romeo Akbar Walter, Kesari, The Family Man and Dishoom .

Filmography 
Actor
Mushtaq Kak has worked in some of the popular movies of Indian Cenima between 2007 and 2022. 
Amal (2007) as Doctor
Hijack (2008) as main villain (Mushtaq) 
Sikandar (2009) as Moulvi Allah Baksh 
Vishwaroopam-I (2013) as Manawar 
Dishoom (2016) as a Shopkeeper 
M.S. Dhoni: The untold Story (2016) as a Shopkeeper 
Vishwaroopam II (2018) as Manawar
Romeo Akbar Walter (2019) as Joker 
The Family Man (2019) as General Khursheed 
Shikara (2020) Masud ahib 
Shahid
 I AM Mega (2020 film)As Shopkeeper 
 Kesari as Ameer

References

1961 births
Kashmiri people
Living people
Recipients of the Sangeet Natak Akademi Award